Khawaja Inaitullah was an Indian politician. He was a Member of Parliament, representing Bihar in the Rajya Sabha, the upper house of India's Parliament, as a member of the Indian National Congress.

References

Rajya Sabha members from Bihar
Indian National Congress politicians
1899 births
Year of death missing
Indian National Congress politicians from Bihar